This is a list of films produced by the Ollywood film industry based in Bhubaneshwar and Cuttack in 1970:

A-Z

References

1970
Ollywood
Films, Ollywood
1970s in Orissa